Eliav is a Hebrew given name/surname found in the bible, Torah, meaning "My God is the father".

People
Yaakov Eliav, Russian-Israeli member of the Jewish Resistance Movement
Aryeh Eliav, Israeli politician and member of the Knesset.
Binyamin Eliav, Israeli politician and diplomat.
Isaac of Norwich, also known as Isaac ben Eliav, a Jewish-English financier.
Guy Eliav,  creator of the webcasting company BlogTV.
Eliav Meir, chief rabbi of the Hevel Modi'in Regional Council.
Eliav Nahlieli, Israeli museologist who designed the Chain of Generations Center, a Jewish history museum, adjacent to the Western Wall Tunnel.

Places
 Eliav, Israel, an Israeli village named after Aryeh Eliav

Other
 Eliav-Sartawi Award, an awards for the Middle East Journalism

Links